Hawke's Bay Today is a daily compact newspaper published in Hastings, New Zealand and serving Hastings, Napier and the Hawke's Bay region. It is owned by APN News & Media. The Hawke's Bay Today is New Zealand's youngest newspaper, founded on 3 May 1999.

History
Hawke's Bay Today was launched on 3 May 1999, a merger of the dailies the Hawke's Bay Herald-Tribune in Hastings and Napier's Daily Telegraph. Its earliest incarnation was "a Saturday morning weekly named the Hawke's Bay Herald and Ahuriri Advocate, which first rolled off the presses in Napier on 24 September 1857," according to the company website.

The Saturday evening Hawke's Bay Today was discontinued in 2002 to make way for the new weekend edition published on Saturday mornings.

In 2005 the local news content of the Dannevirke News was merged with Hawke's Bay Today. Copies of Hawke's Bay Today circulating in the Dannevirke area now carry a minimum of four local pages of news and advertising wrapped around the main section of the paper.

On 19 March 2012, Hawke's Bay Today became a morning newspaper. It was previously released in the afternoon.
On 25 February 2013, the paper moved from a broadsheet to compact size.

References
 Hawke's Bay Today – About Us – Official website

External links
 Hawke's Bay Today – official website

Newspapers published in New Zealand
Hawke's Bay Region
Mass media in Hastings, New Zealand
Publications established in 1999
New Zealand Media and Entertainment
1999 establishments in New Zealand